N-t-Butyltryptamine (NTBT) is a tryptamine derivative which has serotonergic effects. It is described by Alexander Shulgin as producing "a light-headed intoxication that is a totally pleasant buzz, but nothing more profound than that" at a dosage range of 5 to 20 mg, along with the related sec-butyl isomer NSBT which is similar in effects but slightly less potent.

See also
 alpha-Ethyltryptamine
 4-HO-DSBT
 4-HO-McPeT
 5-Chloro-αMT
 MPMI

References

Tryptamines
Tert-butyl compounds
Secondary amines
Ethyleneamines